Trachyjulus willeyi, is a species of round-backed millipede in the family Cambalopsidae. It is endemic to Sri Lanka. One subspecies is recognized, Trachyjulus willeyi montanus Mauriès, 1982

References

Spirostreptida
Endemic fauna of Sri Lanka
Millipedes of Asia
Animals described in 1941